The railway from Épinal–Bussang is a French 56 km long railway that runs between the cities of Épinal and Remiremont.

Route 
The Épinal–Bussang railway leaves the Gare d'Épinal, entering its terminus Gare de Remiremont after a total length of 56 km. Before 1989, it continued to Bussang. The railway runs along the Moselle river.

Main Stations 
The Épinal–Bussang railway serves three main stations.

 Épinal station
 Arches station
 Remiremont station

Infrastructure 
The speed limit on the line is limited to 90 km/h due to the curvature of the Moselle river, which it runs along.

Partial electrification 
The line was partially electrified (25 kV - 50 Hz) on 23 May 2005 between Épinal et Remiremont, in anticipation of TGV services which began on 10 June 2007. This coincided with the opening of the LGV Est.

Rail services 
The railway is used by SNCF train services part of both the TGV and TER Grand Est networks. The route between Remiremont and Bussang continues to be operated by a replacement bus service.

References 

Railway lines in Grand Est